The Cumberland Narrows (or simply The Narrows) is a water gap in western Maryland in the United States, just west of Cumberland. Wills Creek cuts through the central ridge of the Wills Mountain Anticline at a low elevation here between Wills Mountain to the north and Haystack Mountain to the south. Cliffs and talus of the two mountains' Tuscarora quartzite caprock are prominent within the Narrows. A prominent rocky outcropping at the south end of Wills Mountain in the Cumberland Narrows is known as Lover's Leap.

The geological features of the Narrows provide Cumberland a western backdrop of the two mountains with a narrow gap between them.

Geography

The Cumberland Narrows serves as a western gateway from Cumberland to the Appalachian Plateau and the Ohio River Valley beyond. Nemacolin's Path, which later became Old National Road and is now Alternate U.S. 40, passes through the Narrows, along with the former Baltimore and Ohio Railroad's main line between Baltimore/Washington and Pittsburgh, now part of the CSX system, and a former line of the Western Maryland Railway, now used by the steam- and diesel-powered excursion trains of the Western Maryland Scenic Railroad and the Great Allegheny Passage bike trail.

Lover's Leap
The rocky outcropping known as Lover's Leap is on Wills Mountain on the northeast side of the Cumberland Narrows.

Today, these rocks high above Wills Creek provide one of the most popular views in the Allegheny Mountains, with Cumberland, the highway, and two railroads nearby below and the surrounding states of Pennsylvania and West Virginia in the distance.

Industry
The 46-room Wills Mountain Inn, a turn-of-the-20th-Century hotel and resort with a view of the Narrows, was located on the northern side of Wills Mountain until it burned-down on August 6, 1930.

The Artmor Plastics Corporation was located on the Wills Mountain (northern) side of the Narrows in a former World War II textile factory. Artmor made household items such as plastic dishes and table tops. Following the closure of Artmor Plastics, the factory housed a museum chronicling the life of Arthur Morgan, Artmor's founder, as well as his rich art and history collection. After the death of Arthur Morgan, the building fell into disuse and disrepair and was the victim of frequent vandalism. 

Local officials attempted to purchase the property with State funds to add it to Wills Mountain State Park. However, they were unable to come to terms with Artmor's remaining shareholders. On November 11, 2015, the southern half of the former factory building was gutted by a fire set by a local youth. The loss was estimated to be $750,000.

References

Will H. Lowdermilk, "History of Cumberland", Clearfield Co., October 1997, Paperback, . Full Text Online
McGuinness, "Along the Baltimore & Ohio Railroads", Arcadia Publishing, 2004, 
Rogers, "Adventure Guide to the Chesapeake Bay By Stillman D. Rogers, Barbara Radcliffe Rogers",
Hunter Publishing, 2001,

External links

MTNSUB: The Narrows

Landforms of Allegany County, Maryland
Allegheny Mountains
Valleys of Maryland
Places located in Cumberland, MD-WV-PA
Water gaps of the United States